Sawada is a Japanese surname. Notable people with the surname include:

People

Sports

Aki Sawada (born 1988), Japanese figure skater
Atsuo Sawada (born 1964), Japanese wrestler
, Japanese alpine skier
, Japanese pole vaulter
Hiroyuki Sawada (born 1974), former Japanese football player
Kazuki Sawada (born 1982), former Japanese football player
, Japanese cyclist
Kentaro Sawada (born 1970), former Japanese football player
Raymond Sawada (born 1985), Canadian ice hockey player

Arts and entertainment

Fujiko Sawada, Japanese novelist
Kan Sawada, Japanese composer
Kenji Sawada (born 1948), Japanese musician
Kenya Sawada (born 1965), Japanese actor
Kyōichi Sawada (1936–1970), Japanese photographer
Shoko Sawada (born 1962), Japanese singer-songwriter, reporter, and radio personality
, Japanese jazz guitarist
Taiji Sawada, Japanese rock musician
Tomonori Sawada, Japanese composer
Toshiko Sawada (born 1936), Japanese voice actress

Business
Jun Sawada (born 1955), Japanese businessman, CEO of Nippon Telegraph and Telephone

Other 

Noriko Sawada Bridges Flynn (1923-2003), civil rights activist
Setsuzō Sawada, Japanese diplomat
, Japanese general
 Shingo Sawada, Japanese shogi player

Fictional characters 
Captain Sawada, character in the Street Fighter: The Movie videogames
Tsuna Sawada, main character of Reborn!
 Michiko Sawada, a character from anime and manga from Perman

Japanese-language surnames